0137 was a live-broadcast German talk show. It was broadcast between 1991 and 1994 on pay-TV channel Premiere, now known as Sky Deutschland.

The structure of the show consisted of three short interviews of 15 minutes daily from 7:30 pm. The third guest was selected by the audience using phone voting. Hosts of the program included
Sabine Brandi, Maggie Deckenbrock, Sandra Maischberger (1992), Roger Willemsen and Hubert Winkels.

An offshoot, 0137 Night Talk, was hosted by Bettina Rust.

See also
List of German television series

External links
 

German television talk shows
1991 German television series debuts
1993 German television series endings
German-language television shows